"The Pied Piper" is a pop song written by the duo The Changin' Times, consisting of Steve Duboff and Artie Kornfeld, who first recorded it in 1965. Their version reached #87 on the Billboard Hot 100. However, when British pop singer Crispian St. Peters recorded it, he scored a major hit during the summer of 1966. It went to #4 in the United States, #5 in the United Kingdom, and #1 in Canada.

The song's title refers to a fairy tale from German folklore, the titular character of which is The Pied Piper of Hamelin.

Chart history

Weekly charts

Year-end charts

Later uses
An advertisement for the first-generation Toyota Echo in Australia and New Zealand.

The song has been used in three episodes of the HBO series Silicon Valley, where it is sung karaoke by Dinesh.

Used in advertising for Traeger Smokers.

Other versions
 In Italy a well-known cover version was made, with the title "Bandiera gialla" ("Yellow flag"), sung by local artist Gianni Pettenati and the theme song of a popular radio program of that era targeted to the young people.
Jamaican reggae duo Bob and Marcia had a Top 20 hit with their version, taking the song to UK #11 in July 1971.
Cher also covered the song on her 1966 self-titled album.
 In France, Sheila covered the song in French the same year, with the title "Le pipeau".
Rita Marley covered the song in 1967.

References

1965 songs
1965 singles
1966 singles
1971 singles
Songs written by Artie Kornfeld
Crispian St. Peters songs
Del Shannon songs
The Ventures songs
London Records singles
RPM Top Singles number-one singles
Number-one singles in South Africa
Decca Records singles
Jamie Records singles